Pyropia virididentata, formerly known as Porphyra virididentata, is a red alga species in the genus Pyropia. It is endemic to New Zealand. It is monostromatic, monoecious, and grows in the intertidal zone, predominantly on rock substrata. With Porphyra cinnamomea, Pyropia rakiura and Clymene coleana, they can be distinguished by morphology (such as the microscopic arrangement of cells along their thallus margin, their thallus shape, size and colour), as well as geographical, ecological and seasonal distribution patterns, and importantly, chromosome numbers, which in this species n = 3. Finally, these four species are distinguished by a particular nucleotide sequence at the 18S rDNA locus.

The type locality of this species is Island Bay in Wellington. This species is found on the coasts of the lower part of the North Island and the South Island.

It is susceptible to infection by the parasitic oomycete Pythium porphyrae.

References

Further reading
Nelson, W. A., J. E. Broom, and T. J. Farr. "Pyrophyllon and Chlidophyllon (Erythropeltidales, Rhodophyta): two new genera for obligate epiphytic species previously placed in Porphyra, and a discussion of the orders Erythropeltidales and Bangiales." Phycologia 42.3 (2003): 308–315.
Hemmingson, J. A., and W. A. Nelson. "Cell wall polysaccharides are informative in Porphyra species taxonomy." Journal of applied phycology 14.5 (2002): 357–364.
Broom, Judy ES, et al. "Relationships of the Porphyra (Bangiales, Rhodophyta) flora of the Falkland Islands: a molecular survey using rbcL and nSSU sequence data." Australian Systematic Botany 23.1 (2010): 27–37.

Bangiophyceae
Flora of New Zealand
Species described in 2011